Ridgeville is a town in Etowah County, Alabama, United States. It incorporated in 1969 and is part of the Gadsden Metropolitan Statistical Area. At the 2020 census the population was 83, down from 158 in 2000. It is noteworthy for being the only community in Etowah County to have a black majority. Since 1970, it has also been the least populated community wholly within the county.

Geography
Ridgeville is located in central Etowah County at  (34.057110, -86.103232).

Demographics

2020 Census

Note: the US Census treats Hispanic/Latino as an ethnic category. This table excludes Latinos from the racial categories and assigns them to a separate category. Hispanics/Latinos can be of any race.

2000 Census
As of the census of 2000, there were 158 people, 64 households, and 44 families residing in the town. The racial makeup of the town was 79.11% Black or African American, 18.99% White and 1.90% from two or more races.

There were 64 households, out of which 21.9% had children under the age of 18 living with them, 32.8% were married couples living together, 32.8% had a female householder with no husband present, and 29.7% were non-families. 29.7% of all households were made up of individuals, and 7.8% had someone living alone who was 65 years of age or older. The average household size was 2.47 and the average family size was 2.93.

In the town, the population was spread out, with 21.5% under the age of 18, 7.0% from 18 to 24, 24.7% from 25 to 44, 29.7% from 45 to 64, and 17.1% who were 65 years of age or older. The median age was 43 years. For every 100 females, there were 119.4 males. For every 100 females age 18 and over, there were 100.0 males.

The median income for a household in the town was $18,750, and the median income for a family was $16,875. Males had a median income of $34,286 versus $11,250 for females. The per capita income for the town was $17,464. About 45.3% of families and 46.2% of the population were below the poverty line, including 57.4% of those under the age of eighteen and 55.6% of those 65 or over.

References 

Towns in Etowah County, Alabama
Towns in Alabama